Nikolaos Stylianou (born November 9, 1988) is a Cypriot professional basketball player for Keravnos of the Cypriot League. He played college basketball for Navarro College and West Texas A&M. After 3 years of college basketball, Stylianou entered the 2010 NBA draft but was not selected in the draft's two rounds.

College career
Stylianou played college basketball for Navarro College for two years. He then moved to West Texas A&M, where he played until 2009.

Professional career
After playing with West Texas A&M, Stylianou entered the 2010 NBA draft but was not selected in the draft's two rounds. He started his pro career with Rethymno of the Greek A2 League. After one year, he returned to Cyprus and joined AEK Larnaca of the Cypriot Division A.

The following seasons, Stylianou returned to Greece and played for Kavala, Koroivos and OFI Crete, before returning to Cyprus in order to join Keravnos. He won the Cypriot Championship with Keravnos in 2017.

After two years with Keravnos, Stylianou returned to Greece and joined the newly promoted to the Greek League Faros Larissas. He left Faros in order to join Alytus Dzūkija of the Lithuanian Basket League.

National team career
Stylianou has been a member of the junior national teams of Cyprus for some years. He is currently one of the leaders of the Cyprus national team.

References

External links
RealGM.com Profile
Profile

1988 births
Living people
AEK Larnaca B.C. players
BC Dzūkija players
Cypriot men's basketball players
Greek men's basketball players
Gymnastikos S. Larissas B.C. players
Kavala B.C. players
Keravnos B.C. players
Koroivos B.C. players
Kymis B.C. players
OFI Crete B.C. players
Rethymno B.C. players
Small forwards
Basketball players from Athens
Navarro Bulldogs basketball players
Greek expatriate basketball people in the United States
Greek expatriate basketball people in Lithuania
West Texas A&M Buffaloes basketball players
Cypriot expatriate basketball people in the United States